Al-Sa'an (also spelled as-Si'in and also known as Sa'n al-Shajara) is a Syrian town located in the al-Sa'an Subdistrict in Salamiyah District, located in the Syrian Desert, 50 kilometers northeast of Salamiyah and northeast of Hama. According to the Syria Central Bureau of Statistics (CBS), al-Sa'an had a population of 3,360 in the 2004 census. Its inhabitants are predominantly Ismailis.

Al-Sa'an was founded in the late 19th century by Ismaili migrants from other parts of northern Syria who chose to settle the place because of worsening economic conditions in the interior parts of Syria, the low taxes that living in the Syrian Desert fringes offered, and the place's proximity to Salamiyah, the center of Ismaili life in Syria. During the Ottoman era, when it was founded, it became the remotest Ismaili village in Syria. At the time, it contained a military post manned by Ottoman troops.

References 

Populated places established in the 19th century
Populated places in Salamiyah District
19th-century establishments in the Ottoman Empire
Ismaili communities in Syria